Daniela L. Rus is a roboticist and computer scientist, Director of the MIT Computer Science and Artificial Intelligence Laboratory (CSAIL), and the Andrew and Erna Viterbi Professor in the Department of Electrical Engineering and Computer Science (EECS)  at the Massachusetts Institute of Technology.

Biography 
Daniela L. Rus was born in Romania before immigrating to the United States with her parents. Her father, Teodor Rus, is an emeritus professor of computer science at the University of Iowa.

She earned her bachelor's degree in computer science in 1985 from the University of Iowa, before getting a PhD in 1993 at Cornell University under the supervision of John Hopcroft. She started her academic career as a Professor in the Computer Science Department at Dartmouth College before moving to MIT in 2004.

Since 2012 she has served as Director of MIT Computer Science and Artificial Intelligence Laboratory (CSAIL), which - with more than 125 faculty and 1500+ members - is the university's largest interdepartmental research lab.

As director of CSAIL, she launched a number of research programs and initiatives, including the AI Accelerator program, Toyota-CSAIL Joint Research Center, Communities of Research (CoR), a DEI postdoctoral program called METEOR, Future of Data Trust and Privacy, Machine Learning Applications, Fintech, Cybersecurity. As head of CSAIL's Distributed Robotics Lab, Rus focuses her research on the science and engineering of autonomy, with the goal of developing systems that seamlessly integrate into people's lives to support them with cognitive and physical tasks.

Rus is a member of the National Academy of Engineering (NAE), the Americal Adacemy of Arts and Sciences (AAAS), and a fellow of  ACM, AAAI, and IEEE. She was also the recipient of an NSF Career award and an Alfred P. Sloan Foundation fellowship, and of the 2002 MacArthur Fellowship.

Work 
Rus has published an extensive collection of research articles that span the fields of robotics, artificial intelligence (AI), machine learning, and computational design.

In her work Rus has sought to expand the notion of what a robot can be, exploring such topics as soft robotics, self-reconfigurable modular robots, swarm robotics, and 3D printing. Her research approaches the study of the science and engineering of autonomy as integrated hardware-software, or body-brain systems. She has said that she views the body of the robot as critical in “defining the range of capabilities of the robot,” and the brain critical in “enabling the body to deliver on its capabilities."

To this end, she has developed a range of algorithms for computation design and fabrication of robots, for increasing the learning capabilities of machines in safety-critical applications, and for coordinating teams of machines and people. 
In addition to contributing fundamentally to the design, control, planning, and learning for agents, Rus also considered what is necessary for robots to be deployed in the world. One example is her project to develop self-driving vehicles.

She has also spoken and written widely about larger topics in technology, like the role of robotics and AI in the future of work, AI for Good, and computational sustainability.

Robotics 
Rus has contributed some of the first multi-robot system algorithms with performance guarantees in distributed robotics, by introducing a control-theoretic optimization approach for adaptive decentralized coordination. Key to these results is the tight coupling between perception, control, and communication. The control algorithms are decentralized, adaptive, and provably stable.

Her group has developed self-configuring modular robots that can alter their physical structures to perform different tasks. This includes sets of robotic cubes that use angular movement to assemble into different formations, and magnet-controlled robots that can walk, sail and glide using different dissolvable exoskeletons. She has also worked on algorithms for robots to fly in swarms, and for boats to autonomously navigate the canals of Amsterdam & self-assemble as floating structures.

Rus was an early contributor to the field of soft robotics, which some researchers believe has the potential to outperform traditional hard-bodied robotics in a range of human environments. Her work has introduced self-contained autonomous robotic systems such as an underwater “fish” used for ocean exploration  and dexterous hands that can grasp a range of different objects. Rus has created inexpensive designs and fabrication techniques for a range of silicon-based robots and 3D-printable robots, with the goal of making it easier for non-experts to make their own.

Her projects have often drawn inspiration from nature, including the robotic fish and a trunk-like robot imbued with touch sensors. She has also explored the potential of extremely small-scale robots, like an ingestible origami robot that could unfold in a person's stomach to patch wounds. Other work has revolved around robots for a range of logistics environments, including one that can disinfect a warehouse floor in 30 minutes.

Machine learning 
Rus and her team are trying to address some of the key challenges with today's methods for machine learning, including data quality and bias, explainability, generalizability, and sustainability. She is working on a new class of machine learning models that she calls “liquid networks” that can more accurately estimate uncertainty, better understand the cause-and-effect of tasks, and even that can continuously adapt to new data inputs rather than only learning during the training phase. 
Rus' research has also involved developing machine learning systems for a range of use cases and industries, including for autonomous technologies for vehicles on land, in the air and at sea. 
She has worked on algorithms to improve autonomous driving in difficult road conditions, from country roads to snowy weather, and also released an open-source simulation engine that researchers can use to test their algorithms for autonomous vehicles.

Human/robot interaction 
Many of the Distributed Robotics Lab's projects have focused on enabling smoother and more natural interaction and collaboration between humans and robots.  Rus has created feedback systems that allow human users to subconsciously communicate through brainwave activity whether a robot has made a mistake in manufacturing environments. Using wearable body sensors, she has developed systems that enable users to more smoothly control drones and work with to lift and transport goods.

Her group has also worked on projects geared towards helping the physically disabled. They have collaborated with the Andrea Bocelli Foundation to create wearable systems  to help guide the visually impaired, as well as a “smart glove” that uses machine learning to interpret sign language.

Computational design and fabrication 
In recent years Rus has worked with MIT colleague Wojciech Matusik to create methods for 3D-printing robots and other functional objects, often made out of multiple different types of material. She has 3D-printed soft robots with embedded electronics, items with tunable mechanical properties, and even “smart gloves” that could help with grasping tasks for people with motor-coordination issues. 
Her group has developed methods for 3D-printing materials to sense how they are moving and interacting with their environment, which could be used to create soft robots that have some sort of understanding of their own posture and movements.

Awards 
In 2017, Rus was included in Forbes "Incredible Women Advancing A.I. Research" list.

Rus was elected a member of the National Academy of Engineering in 2015 for contributions to distributed robotic systems.

A select list of her awards include:

 2023 IEEE Robotics and Automation Technical Award 
 2020 named to White House science council 
 2022 Schmidt Futures’ AI2050 Fellow            
 2022 The Boston Globe's Tech Power Players 50                              
 2021 AI Magazine's Top 10 Women in AI                    
 2021 Top 100 Women in Tech (16)        
 2020 IJCAI John McCarthy Award  
 2019 Mass TLC Innovation Catalyst Award    
 2018 IEEE Pioneer in Robotics and Automation Award 
 2017 Engelberger Robotics Award  
 2021 Elected fellow of the American Association for the Advancement of Science
 2017 Elected member of the American Academy of Arts and Sciences 
 2015 Elected member of the National Academy of Engineering
 2015 Elected fellow of the Association for Computing Machinery   
 2009 Elected fellow of the Association for the Advancement of Artificial Intelligence (AAAI)  
 2002 Awarded the MacArthur Fellowship (“genius grant”)

References

External links 
 Daniela Rus Home page at MIT
 Daniela Rus CSAIL home page
 Daniela Rus MacArthur Fellows Page
 MIT Distributed Robotics Lab Homepage

Living people
American computer scientists
American roboticists
Women roboticists
Control theorists
American women computer scientists
Cornell University alumni
Dartmouth College faculty
MIT School of Engineering faculty
MacArthur Fellows
Romanian emigrants to the United States
Scientists from Cluj-Napoca
Fellows of the Association for the Advancement of Artificial Intelligence
Year of birth missing (living people)
Fellows of the American Academy of Arts and Sciences
American women academics
MIT Computer Science and Artificial Intelligence Laboratory people
21st-century American women
Scientific American people